Sreenivasa Rao Jammalamadaka, also known as J.S. Rao,  is a statistician specializing in directional statistics, Goodness of fit tests, Spacings, and aspects of large sample efficiencies and inference. He was born in Munipalle, Andhra Pradesh, India, and currently is a naturalized US citizen. He now resides and works at the University of California, Santa Barbara as a Distinguished Professor in Statistics. He is known for his important contributions to circular statistics and to tests and estimation based on spacings.

Life and career
J.S. Rao was educated for a year at the YRS and VRN College in Chirala, followed by the Indian Statistical Institute, Kolkata (B. Stat.1964, M.Stat. 1965, and Ph.D. 1969), where he received education from notable professors including P.C. Mahalanobis, C. R. Rao, J.B.S. Haldane, and D. Basu.  He held academic positions at the Indiana University, Bloomington and the University of Wisconsin, Madison, before settling at the University of California, Santa Barbara from 1976. He was instrumental in establishing the Department of Statistics and Applied Probability at the University of California, Santa Barbara, for which he served as its first Chairman. He now holds the position as a Distinguished Professor at the University of California, Santa Barbara.

J.S. Rao is the author of over 200 publications and has written 3 scholarly books and edited conference proceedings and other special volumes. He has guided 46 Ph.D. students  thus far. For his research guidance and mentoring activity at UCSB and worldwide, the University of California, SB recognized him in 2017 with an Outstanding Graduate Mentor Award. His students and co-workers brought out a Festschrift in his honor in 2011.
In 2012 he was awarded an Honorary Doctorate in Forest Sciences by the Swedish University of Agricultural Sciences.

J.S. Rao is an Elected a Member of the International Statistical Institute (1977), Fellow of the Institute of Mathematical Statistics (1990),  Fellow of the Institute of Combinatorics and its Applications (1990), Fellow of the American Statistical Association (1993), and an Honorary Fellow of the Indian Society for Probability and Statistics (2014). He received an Award for Academic Excellence from his compatriots, the Telugu Association of North America in 1997.  In 2019, he received the C. R. Rao Lifetime Achievement Award from the Indian Society for Probability and Statistics.

Books

 Topics in Circular Statistics (coauthored with Ashis SenGupta)
 Essential Statistics with Python and R
 Linear Models and Regression with R-An Integrated Approach(coauthored with Debasis Sengupta)

References

External links
 Homepage
 A Conversation with JS Rao.

Living people
University of California, Santa Barbara faculty
1944 births
People with acquired American citizenship
People from Guntur district
Indian emigrants to the United States
Fellows of the American Statistical Association